Taimanov is a Russian masculine surname, its feminine counterpart is Taimanova. It may refer to
 Iskander Taimanov (born 1961), Russian mathematician 
 Mark Taimanov (1926–2016), Russian chess Grandmaster and concert pianist

See also
 Taimanov Variation, various chess openings used by Mark Taimanov

Russian-language surnames